The O'Donnell dynasty ( or Ó Domhnaill, Ó Doṁnaill or Ua Domaill; meaning "descendant of Dónal") were the dominant Irish clan of the kingdom of Tyrconnell, Ulster, in medieval Ireland.

Naming conventions

Origins
Like the family of O'Neill, that of O'Donnell of Tyrconnell was of the Uí Néill, i.e. descended from Niall of the Nine Hostages, High King of Ireland at the beginning of the 5th century; the O'Neill, or Cenél nEógain, tracing their pedigree to Eógan mac Néill, and the O'Donnells, or Cenél Conaill, to Conall Gulban, both sons of Niall. Conall was baptised by St. Patrick.

Arms and motto
The Roman Emperor Constantine the Great converted to Christianity after a vision before the famous Battle of the Milvian Bridge, having seen a chi-rho in the sky, and thence the motto In Hoc Signo Vinces, telling him he would be victorious with the sign of the cross. The chi-rho was adopted on a banner, the labarum, upheld on a vexillum, which resembled a Christian cross, and in time the motto became associated with the Cross all over Europe.  Legend has it that St. Patrick struck the shield of Conall, son of King Niall of the Nine Hostages, with his crosier, called Bachal Isu (the staff of Jesus) inscribing thereon a sign of the cross and told him the same, and baptized him. According to the Life and Acts of Saint Patrick (chapter 138), commissioned by Sir John de Courcy and written by Jocelyn of Furness (c. 1185 AD), St. Patrick took his staff, known as the staff of Jesus, or Bacall Iosa, and struck the shield of Prince Conall, rendering a sign of the Cross on it, “et mox cum baculo suo, qui baculus Jesu dicebatur Crucis signum ejus scuto impressit, asserens neminem de stirpe ejus in bello vincendum qui signum illud”, and thus indicating that he and his offspring would henceforth be victorious in battle if they followed that sign This legend is also described several centuries later in the Lebhar Inghine i Dhomhnaill. His land became Tír Chonaill, Tyrconnell, the land of Conall.

Conall's Constantinian shield, and this motto, have been the main O’Donnell arms in various forms, through the centuries. The motto also appears prominently placed as a motto on a ribbon unfurled with a passion cross to its left, beneath a window over the Scala Regia, adjacent to Bernini's equestrian statue of Emperor Constantine, in the Vatican. Emperors and other monarchs, having paid respects to the Pope, descended the Scala Regia, and would observe the light shining down through the window, with the motto, reminiscent of Constantine's vision, and be reminded to follow the Cross. They would thence turn right into the atrium of St. Peter's Basilica, ostensibly so inspired. In an earlier version (before Bernini's renovations in the mid-17th century), something similar may have resonated with and been observed by Prince Rory O'Donnell, 1st Earl of Tyrconnell following his visit to Pope Paul V (at the Palazzo Quirinale) in Rome, just prior to his death in 1608. It would certainly have resonated with and been observed by Cardinal Patrick O'Donnell.

Territory
Tyrconnell, the territory named after the Cenel Conaill, is the vast territory where the O'Donnells held sway, comprised the greater part of the modern county of Donegal except the peninsula of Inishowen. But it also included areas outside Donegal, such as the baronies of Carbury in County Sligo, Rosclogher in County Leitrim, and Magheraboy and Firlurg in County Fermanagh, and part of southern County Londonderry, hence it straddled the modern Republic of Ireland and also part of Northern Ireland in the UK.  The jewel in the O'Donnell crown was Donegal Castle, one of seven O'Donnell castles, and now a national monument partially restored by the Office of Public Works. Tyrconnell also therefore bordered on territory ruled by the O'Neills of Tyrone, who were periodically attempting to assert their claim of supremacy over it, and hence the history of the O'Donnells is for the most part a record of clan warfare with their powerful neighbours, and of their own efforts to make good their claims to the overlordship of northern Connacht, and a wider swathe of Ulster. Nonetheless Tyrconnell existed for a period as an independent kingdom, recognised by King Henry III of England.

Ascendancy
Gofraidh Ó Domhnaill, the first chieftain, was son of Domhnall Mór Ó Domhnaill.  In 1257, Gofraidh was victorious when he went to battle at Creadran-Cille against Maurice FitzGerald.  Upon Gofraidh's death, subsequent to wounds incurred during battle against Ó Néill, he was succeeded in the chieftainship by his brother Domhnall Óg, who returned from Scotland in time to withstand successfully the demands of Ó Néill. Over time, the O'Donnell King of Tyrconnell became known as the Fisher-King, on the Continent, ostensibly due to the export of fish traded for wine in La Rochelle.

Patronage by the O'Donnell dynasty
The O'Donnells were patrons of the arts, literature, and of religious benefices. In particular, one, Manus, wrote the biography of ColmCille (St. Columba). They also were the patrons of the Franciscans in Donegal Abbey. They also exercised "jus patronus" to nominate bishops.

In the early 14th century A.D., the O'Donnell rulers aided Templar knights fleeing via Sligo and Tyrconnell to Scotland where a Templar priory existed at Ballymote , a Percival family estate for the last 300 years.

The O’Donnell rulers of Tyrconnell are also noted for having in the late 12th century given sanctuary to the Donlevy dynasty of Ulaid (Ulster), after their kingdom had fallen to John de Courcy in 1177. It is in Tyrconnell that a branch of the Donlevy's became known as the MacNulty's, deriving from the Irish Mac an Ultaigh, meaning "son of the Ulsterman", in reference to their former kingdom of Ulaid. During the Donlevy exile in Tyrconnell, The O’Donnell gave them the high Gaelic status of “ollahm leighis”  or his official physicians.

It was in fact two of these deposed MacDonlevy (> MacNulty) royals and Roman Catholic priests thereto exiled in Tyrconnell, Fathers Muiris Ulltach in full Muiris mac Donnchadh Ulltach Ó Duinnshléibhe and Muiris Ulltach in full Muiris mac Seaán Ulltach Ó Duinnshléibhe, who both along with the Archbishop of Tuam attended Hugh Roe O'Donnell (aka Red Hugh O’Donnell), The O'Donnell of 1601 Kinsale fame, in his exile at his death bed at Simancas Castle in Spain in 1602. And, it was in turn an Irish Count O’Donnell, who compassionately married the widow (d. 1708) of Don-Levi, a Jacobite (Jacobitism) and, thereby, on James II of England's and his French allied's failure to reclaim his British crowns, the last The MacDonlevy to sit in Ireland (departed 1691), after this prince died in exile with the Stuarts in France at the Archbishopric of Treves. This union of the MacDonlevy and the O'Donnell, though, bore no issue.

In absence of these indulgences of the O’Donnell dynasty kings having maintained the MacDonlevy and MacNulty physicians as a dignified community, it is debatable whether they could have so influenced the course of western medicine, educating and training Niall Ó Glacáin (L. Nellanus Glacanus) in the medical arts, so he could later on the Continent apply empirical method to pioneer the field of forensic anatomy and pathology, first describe the petechial haemorrhages of the lung and swelling of the spleen incident of bubonic plague (Tractatus de Peste, 1629), and early elucidate the empirical method of differential diagnosis for the continental European medical community, and producing the medieval physician and medical scholar Cormac MacDonlevy translator from Latin to vernacular of Bernard de Gordon's Lilium Medicine, Gaulteris Agilon's De dosibus and Gui de Chuliac's Chirurgia.

Later in the early 13th century, the O’Donnell also gave succor to the Ó Cléirigh kings of Uí Fiachrach Aidhne. Onara Ultach was descended of the MacDonlevy (dynasty) royals of Ulidia (kingdom), who as above noted after the fall of that Ulster kingdom to the Anglo-Norman forces of Henry Plantagenet served as ollam lieghis or the official physicians to the O'Donnell kings of Tyrconnell.  Onara married Donnchadh Ó Cléirigh, a son of the Chief of the name of the Ó Cléirigh family then also of Tyconnell. The Ó Cléirigh were too a learned Irish royal family that had lost their sub-kingdom in Uí Fiachrach Aidhne in what is today County Galway to the Anglo-Norman forces of Henry Plantagenet. The Ó Cléirigh then went into service of the O’Donnell as poet historians, scribes and secretaries or official bards, called in Irish language "ollam righ". Onara bore for Donnchadh a son Mícheál Ó Cléirigh (c. 1590 – 1643), anglicized Michael O’Cleary, who matured to become the principal author of the Annals of the Four Masters. But for the manifold grace of the O’Donnell, this union would never have occurred, and Michael O’Cleary never lived to memorialize this history of Gaelic Ireland.

Royal Household
The Royal Household was known in Gaelic as "Lucht Tighe" and comprised several offices that were performed on a hereditary basis by the heads and members of particular other families, for over four centuries.

Lector & Inaugurator of the Chieftaincy - O'Friel (Ó Frighil)
Gallowglass Marshalls & Standard - Bearers - McSweeney (Mac Suibhne)
Commanders of Cavalry - O'Gallagher (Ó Gallchobhair)
Custodians of the Cathach of St. Columba - Roarty (Mac Robhartaigh)
Historians and Scribes - O'Clery (Ó Cléirigh), formerly kings of Uí Fiachrach Aidhne
Brehons or Judges - Breslin (Ó Breaslain)
Bards & Poets - Ward (Mac an Bhaird)
Physicians - Donleavy (Mac Duinnshléibhe), formerly Kings of Ulster (Dál Fiatach of Ulaid)
Herenagh of church lands/Custodians of Donegal Castle & Ballyshannon Castle - McMenamin (Mac Meanman) 
Stockmen/Cattle Drivers - Timoney (Ó Tiománaigh)

Later struggles and diaspora
The O'Donnells defeated the O'Neills in the 1522 Battle of Knockavoe. In 1541 Manus O'Donnell took part in the "Surrender and regrant" process. In 1567 the O'Donnells won the Battle of Farsetmore against the O'Neills, reconfirming their autonomy in Ulster.

During the Nine Years' War of 1594-1603, the O'Donnells of Tyrconnell played a leading part, led by the famous Prince Red Hugh O'Donnell. Under his leadership, and that of his ally Hugh O'Neill, they advanced to Kinsale and laid siege to the English forces in anticipation of a Spanish invasion. En route, they implanted some O'Donnell kinsmen in Ardfert and Lixnaw to protect the territories of their ally, FitzMaurice, Lord of Kerry. The Battle of Kinsale was lost in 1601, heralding the end of the Gaelic order and Brehon Laws in Ireland, and the completion of the Elizabethan conquest. Following the Treaty of Mellifont of 1603 the new King James I pardoned Rory O'Donnell and created him Earl of Tyrconnell in the Irish peerage.

Rory then  joined in the Flight of the Earls in 1607, which led to the title becoming attainted in 1614, and Tyrconnell and Ulster being colonised in the Plantation of Ulster. He died in exile in Rome on 28 July 1608.

Upon Rory O'Donnell's death in 1608, his son Hugh, who took the additional name Albert at his confirmation, under the patronage of Archduke Albert, succeeded to the title as 2nd Earl of Tyrconnell (which title was attainted in 1614 by the Crown but which attainder did not have any effect on his use of it in the Spanish realm) and thus the last titular earl of Tyrconnell was this Rory's son Hugh Albert, who died without heirs in 1642, and who by his will appointed Hugh Balldearg O'Donnell his heir. To a still elder branch belonged Daniel O'Donnell (1666–1735), a general of the Irish Brigade in the French service, whose father, Turlough, was a son of Hugh Duff O'Donnell, brother of Manus, son of an earlier Hugh Duff. Daniel served in the French army in the wars of the period, fighting against Duke of Marlborough at the battles of Oudenarde and Malplaquet at the head of an O'Donnell regiment.

Succession
The head of the dynasty was traditionally also called "The O'Donnell", and inaugurated as Chieftain in an elaborate ceremony, under the Laws of Tanistry, part of the ancient Brehon Code of Law. Since the collapse of Gaelic Rule and the Brehon legal system, the putative succession of the "Chiefs of the Name" has followed the principle of male primogeniture.

On the basis of the information available at the time, the Chief Herald of Ireland recognized John O'Donel of the Larkfield branch as Chief of the Name, and he was so gazetted on 11 September 1945 in Iris Oifigiuil, bearing the courtesy title of "The O'Donnell". His son, i.e. the latest in the line of Chiefs of the Name of O'Donnell of Tyrconnell, is Fr. Hugh Ambrose O'Donel, O.F.M., a Franciscan priest in Killiney, retired from missionary work in Zimbabwe. His Tánaiste (heir apparent) as The O'Donnell of Tyrconnell, Chief of the Name of O'Donnell, is S.E. Don Hugo O'Donnell, Duke of Tetuan, a Grandee of Spain. He is known as S.E. Don Hugo O'Donnell y Duque de Estrada - the latter appendant Duque de Estrada is not a title but a maternal family name. Don Hugo is an active member of the Clan Association of the O'Donnells of Tyrconnell, and a member of the nobiliary Sovereign Military Hospitaller Order of Saint John of Jerusalem, of Rhodes, and of Malta, i.e. a Knight of Malta. However, following advice of the Attorney General, in 2003 the Genealogical Office discontinued the practice of recognising Chiefs.

Descendants
Melaghlin O'Donnell (d. 1247), The O'Donnell, King of Tyrconnell,  son of King Domhnall Mór O'Donnell
Gofraid O'Donnell (d.1257), The O'Donnell, King of Tyrconnell, son of Domhnall Mór O'Donnell
Donnell Óg O'Donnell (c. 1242-1281), The O'Donnell, crowned King of Tyrconnell in Raphoe Cathedral in 1258 
Hugh Roe O'Donnell, the 1st, The O'Donnell, King of Tyrconnell, builder of Donegal Castle, (d.1505) 
Sir Hugh Duff O'Donnell, The O'Donnell, King of Tyrconnell (d.1537)
Manus O'Donnell (1490–1564), The O'Donnell, King of Tyrconnell, biographer of Saint Colmcille or Columba
Calvagh O'Donnell (d. 1566), The O'Donnell, 22nd Chieftain and Lord of Tyrconnell
Sir Hugh O'Donnell (c.1540-1601), The O'Donnell, King of Tyrconnell
Sir Donnell O'Donnell (d. 1590), Seneschal of Tyrconnell and Sheriff of Donegal, eldest son of Sir Hugh O'Donnell, King   
Nuala O'Donnell (1565 - 1630), daughter of Sir Hugh Dubh O'Donnell, King 
Conn O'Donnell (d.1583), of Lifford, son of Calvagh and father of Niall Garve
Conn Oge O'Donnell (d.1601), of Lifford, youngest son of Conn, brother of Niall Garve
Niall Garve O'Donnell (1569–1626), Lord of Lifford
Hugh Roe Ó Donnell (1572–1601), The O'Donnell, 24th Chieftain, Prince and Lord of Tyrconnell
Rory O'Donnell, 1st Earl of Tyrconnell (1575–1608), The O'Donnell, Prince and Lord of Tyrconnell
Hugh O'Donnell, 2nd Earl of Tyrconnell (1606–1642), Prince and Lord of Tyrconnell
Mary Stuart O'Donnell (1607-c.1639), Irish noblewoman, daughter of Rory, The O'Donnell, Prince and Lord of Tyrconnell
Daniel O'Donnell (Irish Brigade) (1666–1735), brigadier-general in the Irish Brigade in the French service
Karl O'Donnell (1715–1771), Count of Tyrconnell
Henry O'Donnell (1769–1834), Count of La Bisbal, Irish-Spanish nobleman (:de:Joseph Heinrich O’Donnell)
Maurice O'Donnell de Tyrconnell (1780–1843), of Pressburg, also known as Moritz Graf O'Donnell von Tyrconnell, an Irish-Austrian count
Maximilian Karl Lamoral O'Donnell von Tyrconnell, (1812–1895), Irish-Austrian count, son of Maurice/Moritz
Jean Louis Barthélemy O'Donnell (1783–1836), Irish-French Count, member of Napoleon's Conseil d’État and Légion d'honneur
Leopoldo O'Donnell, 1st Duke of Tetuan (1809–1867), former Prime Minister of Spain
Carlos O'Donnell, 2nd Duke of Tetuán (1834-1903), Spanish foreign minister and Mayordomo mayor to King Amadeo I.
Juan O'Donnell, 3rd Duke of Tetuan (1864-1928), conducted Winston Churchill on visit to Cuba 
Peadar O'Donnell (1893-1986), radical Irish republican, socialist, activist, and politician
Patrick O'Donnell (cardinal) (1856-1927) of Glenties, Irish nationalist, Bishop of Raphoe, Archbishop of Armagh, and Cardinal
Denis O'Donnell (1875-1933), Entrepreneur, Founder of Lee Strand Cooperative Creamery
Patrick Denis O'Donnell (1922-2005), Commandant/Irish Defence Forces, UN peacekeeper, military historian and author
Francis Martin O'Donnell (b. 1954), Ambassador, Knight of Malta, papal knight, trustee/director, former UN senior representative, author
Guillermo O'Donnell, (1936-2011), Argentine political scientist, professor, author, and international activist for democracy
Hugo O'Donnell, 7th Duke of Tetuan (b. 1948), Spanish naval historian and Knight of Malta
O'Donnell baronets, of Newport House, recovered & entrusted Cathach of St. Columba to the Royal Irish Academy

Recent times
Cardinal Patrick O'Donnell was probably the next most famous O'Donnell to emerge in Ireland after the exile of Rory O'Donnell, 1st Earl of Tyrconnell. Thomas O'Donnell MP for West Kerry (1900–1918) was a leading agrarian reformer, and the first Member of Parliament to address the House of Commons in Westminster in the Irish language (Gaelic), but was called to order by the Speaker, but not without having made his mark with John Redmond's support. There is currently an Irish Senator from County Donegal named Brian o Domhnaill (o Donnell).

See also
 Irish nobility
 Gaelic nobility of Ireland
 O'Donnell Abu

Notes

References

Further reading

The Life of Hugh Roe O'Donnell, Prince of Tyrconnell (Beatha Aodh Ruadh O Domhnaill) by Lughaidh O'Cleirigh. Edited by Paul Walsh and Colm Ó Lochlainn. Irish Texts Society, vol. 42. Dublin: Educational Company of Ireland, 1948 (original Gaelic manuscript in the Royal Irish Academy in Dublin).
Annals of the Kingdom of Ireland (Annála Ríoghachta Éireann) by the Four Masters, from the earliest period to the year 1616, compiled during the period 1632-1636 by Brother Mícheál Ó Cléirigh, translated and edited by John O'Donovan in 1856, and re-published in 1998 by De Burca, Dublin.

Vicissitudes of Families, by Sir Bernard Burke, Ulster King of Arms, published by Longman, Green, Longman and Roberts, Paternoster Row, London, 1861. (Chapter on O’Donnells, pages 125-148).
A View of the Legal Institutions, Honorary Hereditary Offices, and Feudal Baronies established in Ireland, by William Lynch, Fellow of the Society of Antiquaries, published by Longman, Rees, Orme, Brown, and Green, Paternoster Row, London, 1830 (O’Donnell: page 190, remainder to Earl’s patent).
The Fate and Fortunes of the Earls of Tyrone (Hugh O’Neill) and Tyrconnel (Rory O’Donel), their flight from Ireland and death in exile, by the Rev. C. P. Meehan, M.R.I.A., 2nd edition, James Duffy, London, 1870.
The Fighting Prince of Donegal, A Walt Disney Film, made in 1966 about the life of Prince Red Hugh O’Donnell (i.e. Hugh Roe), starring Peter McEnery, Susan Hampshire, Gordon Jackson, and Andrew Keir.
Erin’s Blood Royal – The Gaelic Noble Dynasties of Ireland, by Peter Berresford Ellis, Constable, London, 1999, (pages 251-258 on the O’Donel, Prince of Tyrconnell).
Blood Royal - From the time of Alexander the Great to Queen Elizabeth II, by Charles Mosley (genealogist), published for Ruvigny Ltd., London, 2002 (O'Donnell listed as Baron, page v) 
History of Killeen Castle, by Mary Rose Carty, published by Carty/Lynch, Dunsany, County Meath, Ireland, April 1991 - page 18 refers to Elizabeth O'Donnell as 1st Countess of Fingal, by marriage to Lucas Plunkett, 1st Earl of Fingall.
Vanishing Kingdoms - The Irish Chiefs and Their Families, by Walter J. P. Curley (former US Ambassador to Ireland), with foreword by Charles Lysaght, published by The Lilliput Press, Dublin, 2004 [ & ]. (Chapter on O'Donnell of Tyrconnell, page 59).
A Political Odyssey - Thomas O'Donnell, by J. Anthony Gaughan, Kingdom Books, Dublin, 1983.

External links
Official Website of the O’Donnell Clan Association
Ó Domhnail by Francis Martin O'Donnell

 
Irish royal families
Irish clans
Irish families
Ancient Irish dynasties
European families of Irish ancestry
Lists of people by surname